The Symphony in A major ("Mannheim No. 2") is a symphony by Johann Stamitz in the style of the Mannheim school, probably written sometime from 1741 to 1746. It might be Stamitz' first symphony. It consistes of three movements:

Allegro
Andante
Presto

It is about 11 minutes long.

See also
Symphony in G major "Mannheim No. 1" (Stamitz)
Symphony in B-flat major "Mannheim No. 3" (Stamitz)

Notes

Symphony A major
Stamitz
Compositions in A major